Episteme nigripennis is a moth of the family Noctuidae first described by Arthur Gardiner Butler in 1875. It is found in Sri Lanka.

References

Moths of Asia
Moths described in 1875
Agaristinae